The California State Lands Commission is a unit of state government that is responsible for management and protection of natural and cultural resources, as well as public access rights, on some of California's publicly owned lands.

The members of the State Lands Commission include the Lieutenant Governor, the State Controller and the State Director of Finance. The first two are statewide elected officials while the last is a cabinet-level officer appointed by the Governor.

The Commission has a staff of more than 200 people, supervised by an executive officer appointed by the Commissioners. Staff members include specialists in mineral resources, land management, boundary determination, petroleum engineering and natural sciences.

History
From 1850 to 1929, the current functions of the State Lands Commission were assigned to the Office of the California Surveyor General. The Surveyors General and the years of their service were:

 Charles J. Whiting, 1850-1852
 William M. Eddy, 1852-1854
 Senaca H. Marlette, 1854-1856
 John A. Brewster, 1856-1858
 Horace A. Higley, 1858-1862
 James F. Houghton, 1862-1868
 John W. Bost, 1868-1872
 Robert Gardner, 1872-1876
 William Minis, 1876-1880
 James W. Shanklin, 1880-1882
 Henry I. Willey, 1882-1886
 Theodore Reichert, 1886-1894
 Martin J. Wright, 1894-1902
 Victor H. Woods, 1902-1906
 William S. Kingsbury, 1906-1929

References

External links
 

State Lands Commission
Environment of California
Government agencies established in 1938